Albert Augustus of Isenburg-Wächtersbach was a German count of Isenburg-Wächtersbach from 1780 until 1782.

The county itself lasted from 1673 to 1806 in the central Holy Roman Empire, until it was mediated to Isenberg.

Counts of Isenburg-Wächtersbach
18th-century German people